Pirates Cove Marine Provincial Park is a provincial park on De Courcy Island in British Columbia, Canada.

Sources
BC Parks, Ministry of Environment, Accessed January 17, 2019 
Google Maps link, Accessed August 7, 2006

Regional District of Nanaimo
Provincial parks of British Columbia
1968 establishments in British Columbia
Protected areas established in 1968
Marine parks of Canada